"Love Is Gone" is a song by French house DJ David Guetta and American singer Chris Willis. It is the second single from Guetta's third studio album, Pop Life. The single was released in France in June 2007 and in the UK in August 2007. The song reached  9 on the UK Singles Chart, becoming his second Top 10 hit. The song also received crossover airplay on top 40 radio stations in the United States, leading it to reach No. 98 on the Billboard Hot 100 singles chart. The song has been remixed by its co-producers Frédéric Riesterer (as Fred Rister) & Joachim Garraud, Eddie Thoneick, Fuzzy Hair and Amo & Navas. The Fred Rister & Joachim Garraud remix was the first David Guetta production to use a guitar sample which was later used in the songs "I Gotta Feeling" by The Black Eyed Peas and "Gettin' Over". The music video of the song features American actress Kelly Thiebaud.

Track listings
 UK CD1
 "Love Is Gone" (Fred Rister & Joachim Garraud Radio Edit) – 3:22
 "Love Don't Let Me Go" (Original Edit) – 3:39

 UK CD2
 "Love Is Gone" (Fred Rister & Joachim Garraud Radio Edit) – 3:22
 "Love Is Gone" (Original Extended Mix) – 6:43
 "Love Is Gone" (Fred Rister & Joachim Garraud Remix) – 8:21
 "Love Is Gone" (Fuzzy Hair Remix) – 6:25
 "Love Is Gone" (Eddie Thoneick's Liberte Mix) – 7:12
 "Love Is Gone" (Amo & Navas Rmx) – 6:46

French CD Single
 "Love Is Gone" (Fred Rister & Joachim Garraud Radio Edit) – 3:22
 "Love Is Gone" (Original Mix) – 3:08
 "Love Is Gone" (Eddie Thoneick's Liberte Mix) – 7:12
 "Medley Album Pop Life"  – 2:50

European CD Single
 "Love Is Gone" (Original Extended Mix) – 6:43
 "Love Is Gone" (Fred Rister & Joachim Garraud Remix) – 8:21
 "Love Is Gone" (Fuzzy Hair Remix) – 6:25
 "Love Is Gone" (Eddie Thoneick's Liberte Mix) – 7:12
 "Love Is Gone" (Eddie Thoneick's Ruff Mix) – 7:10
 "Love Is Gone" (Amo & Navas Rmx) – 6:46
 "Love Is Gone" (Original Mix) – 3:08
 "Love Is Gone" (Fred Rister & Joachim Garraud Radio Edit) – 3:22

Charts and certifications

Weekly charts

Year-end charts

Certifications

References

2007 singles
David Guetta songs
Chris Willis songs
Songs written by David Guetta
Techno songs
Dance-pop songs
Songs written by Frédéric Riesterer
Songs written by Joachim Garraud
Songs written by Chris Willis
2007 songs
Virgin Records singles
Song recordings produced by David Guetta